Kennishead is a neighbourhood in the Scottish city of Glasgow. Its territory, south of the River Clyde, is fairly isolated, bordering a park to the south and a golf course to the north, as well as the residential area of Carnwadric. The majority of the housing consists of three (originally five, two since demolished) high rise tower blocks of 23 storeys, which dominate the area visually.

The area is also home to the disused farm from which it takes its name, formerly owned by Sir John Maxwell.

Kennishead was originally called "Kenneth's Head".

Kennishead railway station is on the Glasgow South Western Line to Barrhead.

See also
 Glasgow tower blocks

References

External links
D.A.C.K. Community Council

Areas of Glasgow